C. K. Saraswathi (died 1998) was an Indian actress who featured mainly in Tamil films. She was active in the field from 1945 till 1998. During the early days she featured in character roles and in comedy tracks. Later she became famous for her acting in negative character roles. Due to her physical appearance, she was mostly given the role of a mother in rich families. The more noteworthy character she did was in Thillana Mohanambal as Vadivambal (Vadivu), mother of Mohanambal (featured by Padmini).

Filmography

En Magan (1945)
Vidyapathi (1946)
Kanjan (1947) 
Digambara Samiyar (1950) 
Marudhanaattu Ilavarasi (1950) 
Rajambal (1951)
Singari (1951)
Sudharshan (1951)
Azhagi (1953)
Gumastha (1953) 
Lakshmi (1953)
Rohini (film) (1953)
Ulagam (1953)
Illara Jothi (1954)
Kudumbam (1954) 
Thookku Thookki (1954)
Maheswari (1955)
Maaman Magal (1955) 
Menaka (1955)
Nallavan (1955)
Rambaiyin Kaadhal (1956) 
Sadhaaram (1956)
Iru Sagodharigal (1957) 
Samaya Sanjeevi (1957)
Soubhagyavathi (1957) 
Boologa Rambai (1958) 
Maalaiyitta Mangai (1958)
Pathi Bakthi (1958) 
Bhaaga Pirivinai (1959) 
Kaveriyin Kanavan (1959)
Koodi Vazhnthal Kodi Nanmai (1959)
Naan Sollum Ragasiyam (1959) 
Nalla Idathu Sammandham (1959)
Pennkulathin Ponvilakku (1959)
Vannakili (1959)
Engal Selvi (1960)
Kuravanji (1960)
Ponni Thirunaal(1960)
Bhagyalakshmi (1961)
Ellam Unakkaga (1961)
Mamiyarum Oru Veetu Marumagale (1961)
Sri Valli (1961) 
Yar Manamagan? (1961)
Avana Ivan (1962) 
Paadha Kaanikkai (1962)
Paasam (1962) 
Padithal Mattum Podhuma (1962)
as Andal
Paarthal Pasi Theerum (1962) as Akilandam 
Pattinathar (1962) 
Vikramaadhithan (1962)
Naanum Oru Penn (1963)
Karuppu Panam (1964) 
Muradan Muthu (1964)
Navarathri (1964)  (Guest artiste)
Aasai Mugam (1965) 
Madras to Pondicherry (1966)
Mahakavi Kalidas (1966)
Kumari Penn (1966)
Yaar Nee? (1966) 
Kadhal Vaaganam (1968) 
Lakshmi Kalyanam (1968)
Muthu Chippi (1968)
Thillana Mohanambal (1968) 
Iru Kodugal (1969) 
Kanne Pappa (1969) 
Thirudan (1969)
Mannippu (1969) 
Namma Kuzhanthaigal (1970)
Paadhukaappu (1970)
Kulama Gunama (1971)
Aseervatham (1972)
Pillaiyo Pillai (1972)
Ponnukku Thanga Manasu (1973)
Rajapart Rangadurai (1973)
School Master (1973)
Vandhaale Magaraasi (1973) 
Vani Rani (1974)
Manidhanum Dheivamagalam (1975)
Yarukku Maappillai Yaro (1975)
Uzhaikkum Karangal (1976) 
Navarathinam (1977) 
Vattathukkul Chaduram (1978)
Punniya Boomi (1978)
Enga Ooru Rasathi (1980)
Engal Kural (1985)
Nambinar Keduvathillai (1986)
Chinna Thambi (1991)
Bramma (1991)
Suyamariyadhai (1992)
Sakkarai Devan (1993)
Sindhu Nathi Poo (1994)
Naan Petha Magane (1995)
Iruvar (1997)
Kaadhala Kaadhala (1998) 
Ponmaanai Thedi (1998)

References

External links

1998 deaths
Indian film actresses
Actresses from Tamil Nadu
Actresses in Tamil cinema
Year of birth missing
20th-century Indian actresses